The 1961 La Flèche Wallonne was the 25th edition of La Flèche Wallonne cycle race and was held on 16 May 1961. The race started in Liège and finished in Charleroi. The race was won by Willy Vannitsen of the Baratti team.

General classification

References

1961 in road cycling
1961
1961 in Belgian sport
1961 Super Prestige Pernod